Heme oxygenase 2 is an enzyme that in humans is encoded by the HMOX2 gene.

Function 

Heme oxygenase, an essential enzyme in heme catabolism, cleaves heme to form biliverdin, which is subsequently converted to bilirubin by biliverdin reductase, and carbon monoxide, a putative neurotransmitter. Heme oxygenase activity is induced by its substrate heme and by various nonheme substances. Heme oxygenase occurs as 2 isozymes, an inducible heme oxygenase-1 and a constitutive heme oxygenase-2. HMOX1 and HMOX2 (this enzyme) belong to the heme oxygenase family.

References

Further reading